Jonas Klas Håkan Karlsson (born 19 January 1970) is a former freestyle swimmer from Sweden.  He competed for his native country at the 1992 Summer Olympics in the men's 100-metre freestyle.  He was affiliated with the Karlskrona SS.

References
 

1970 births
Living people
Swimmers at the 1992 Summer Olympics
Olympic swimmers of Sweden
Georgia Bulldogs men's swimmers
European Aquatics Championships medalists in swimming
Karlskrona SS swimmers
Swedish male freestyle swimmers
People from Kristianstad Municipality
Sportspeople from Skåne County
20th-century Swedish people